Comer Group is an international firm of property developers based in London. The firm was founded in 1971 by the brothers Luke and Brian Comer of County Galway, Ireland. Initially, they worked as plasterers, progressing to large contract plastering jobs in Ireland before moving to the United Kingdom in 1984. The company's notable projects include the conversion of the listed Friern Hospital (formerly Colney Hatch Lunatic Asylum) to residential accommodation in the mid-1990s as Princess Park Manor.

Photo gallery

References

External links 

Official website.

Property companies based in London
Irish companies established in 1971